Aquilegia nuragica, commonly called Nuragica columbine, is a perennial species of plant in the family Ranunculaceae. It is endemic to Italy, on the island of Sardinia.

Description
They have a single vertical stem. Each division creates a set of three stalks. The flowers of this species are pale blue or white, consisting of five fused petals with its end having a hooked spur. 

It grows on the nearly vertical limestone cliffs, in a gorge along the Flumineddu River. It can occasionally be found on the sandy pebble substrate of the riverbed due to seeds being dispersed from the cliff.

Its natural habitat is in Mediterranean shrubby vegetation.

Status 
It is an IUCN Red List Critically Endangered plant species and IUCN Top 50 Campaign Mediterranean Island Plants, threatened by habitat loss. The Aquilegia nuragica population is very small, with only 10-15 individuals that are believed to exist.

Threats 
The decline in the plant's population seems to be due to natural factors, although due to the inaccessibility of the site, it is difficult to research the decline. It is not affected by grazing due to the plant's toxicity.

Conservation 
This species is currently not under any legal protection.

References

External links

IUCN - Top 50 Mediterranean Island Plants: Aquilegia nuragica (Nuragica Columbine)

nuragica
Flora of Sardinia
Endemic flora of Italy
Critically endangered plants
Taxonomy articles created by Polbot